The Memphis International Auto Show is an annual auto show held every January in Memphis, Tennessee. The event takes place at the Memphis Cook Convention Center in Downtown Memphis and is affiliated with the Motor Trend regional auto show circuit. Despite the event's title name, not all vehicles or automakers are featured due to the limited convention space. Although the event is opened to visitors in the greater Memphis area, including residents from Arkansas and Mississippi, it is mandated at all auto shows in Tennessee that under state law, no sales may take place on the premises, and signs to that effect must be posted. There was no 2021 show, which was deferred to 2022.

Participating automakers

General Motors
Buick
Chevrolet 
GMC
Fiat Chrysler Automobiles
Chrysler
Dodge
Jeep
Ram
Fiat 
Ferrari 
Maserati
Ford Motor Company
Ford
Volkswagen Group
Audi
Bentley 
Lamborghini 
Porsche
Volkswagen
Tata Motors 
Jaguar 
Land Rover
Lotus Cars
BMW North America 
BMW
Mini
Volvo
 DaimlerBenz 
Mercedes-Benz 
Smart
Hyundai Kia Automotive Group
Hyundai
Kia
Honda Motor Company
Acura
Honda
Nissan Motors
Infiniti
Nissan
Toyota Motor Corporation 
Lexus
Toyota
Scion
Mazda
Mitsubishi
Subaru

References

External links
 The Official Website of the Memphis International Auto Show
 Memphis International Auto Show on Facebook

Auto shows in the United States
Tourist attractions in Memphis, Tennessee
Festivals in Tennessee